Serebro (stylized as SEREBRO) was a Russian girl group formed by their manager and producer Maxim Fadeev. Serebro was formed in 2007, consisting of Marina Lizorkina, Olga Seryabkina, and Elena Temnikova as a submitted proposal for consideration by Channel One Russia for the Eurovision Song Contest 2007. Serebro was selected to represent Russia at the 2007 Contest with the song titled "Song #1". They subsequently placed third at the contest, scoring a total of 207 points. Serebro was then officially signed to Fadeev's record label Monolit Records, and in 2012, the group had additional releases produced by Sony Music Entertainment and Ego Music. In 2009, Lizorkina announced her departure from the group; she was subsequently replaced by Anastasia Karpova. Karpova left the group in 2013 and was replaced by Dasha Shashina, who left in 2016. Temnikova left the group in 2014 due to health reasons, and Polina Favorskaya, who replaced Temnikova, left the group in 2017. Favorskaya was later replaced by Morgunova. In 2019, the line-up Olga Seryabkina, Katya Kischuk, and Tatiana Morgunova, the last one to include the last original member, has been replaced by Elizaveta Kornilova, Marianna Kochurova and Irina Titova.

With Lizorkina at the time, the band recorded their debut studio album OpiumRoz. The album received critical acclaim and spawned other singles in addition to "Song #1", but it never became a commercial success. The band's second album, called Mama Lover, proved to be much more successful. It included the massive hit of the same name and went double platinum in Russia. The eponymous "Mama Lover" hit single received media attention worldwide, with reviewers commenting on both the raunchy music video and the song itself. The music video for the song received more than 20 million views on YouTube and became the subject of more than 250 parodies. After the success of "Mama Lover", the group began to garner commercial attention around the world. The group re-released Mama Lover in Japan (under the name Serebration) after signing a contract with EMI Music. Their first international single under Ego Music and Universal Music Group, "Mi Mi Mi", became a success on European music charts.

After their musical and image development, the group became known for a very sexually charged and over the top style. Some of their music videos have led to controversy in the media, including "Mama Lover" and "Mi Mi Mi".

History

Formation and Eurovision Song Contest 2007

In early 2007, producer Maxim Fadeev began preparing a concept for a new band titled Serebro. The concept began as a proposal for Channel One Russia for a new Russian entry into the Eurovision Song Contest 2007. Despite original indications that the concept was for a solo singer, it morphed into a group around the former Star Factory participant Elena Temnikova who was paired with two newcomers: Marina Lizorkina and Olga Seryabkina. On 8 March 2007, the expert panel at Channel One Russia selected Serebro and the song "Song #1" as Russia's entry to the 2007 Eurovision Song Contest. Due to Russia's successful result in the 2006 Contest, Serebro pre-qualified to compete directly in the final of the competition without having to participate in the semi-final.

On 12 May 2007, Serebro performed at the contest and placed third in a field of 24 musical acts from competing nations, scoring 207 points. Serebro later said: "We are happy because of our third place. But, the most important thing is that we weren't there because of ourselves, it was for our fans, for Russia and for the Russian people". The performance in Helsinki became their first official release and first concert for a large live audience.

2007—2008: Debut and OpiumRoz
After the success at Eurovision Song Contest 2007 in Helsinki, Serebro rapidly became one of the most popular bands in Russia. Starting in the summer of 2007, the group gave a number of concerts and performed at events throughout Russia, Kazakhstan, Turkey, Poland, Uzbekistan, and Belarus. All of the band's singles, without their real titles, are named Song #1, #2, #3, etc. According to the group and their management, this should make it easier to recall their songs.

Soon after the Eurovision contest, Serebro released "Song #1" as a single CD, which contained 13 different versions of "Song #1" marked by colours, as well as an extended version of the video. The girls then released a Russian version of "Song #1", called "Песня #1". It was Serebro's first Russian single. The song was a commercial success worldwide, particularly in European markets. The song charted in countries including Russia, Switzerland, Germany, Ireland and the United Kingdom. As soon as the music video was release, the group received much commercial attention. In July 2007, the group released their second song, "Dyshi". Though the song was somewhat commercially successful in their native Russia, the song did not chart around the globe and the group saw a marked drop in the level of commercial attention globally. Later in October, a video for "Dyshi" was released.

At the MTV RMA 2007 Awards, Serebro performed a new song titled "What's Your Problem?", which was then rumored to be the third single from the then-forthcoming studio album, but this was denied in reports. Serebro was nominated in four categories at the MTV RMA 2007 awards: Best Pop-project, Best Debut, Best Song and Best Video, only to win the second nomination. In December 2007, Serebro won another award at the Russian Grammies. Serebro also won a World Music Award in 2007 as the best selling Russian artist. Unlike previous eastern European winners of a World Music Award (e.g. Ruslana from Ukraine in 2004 and Dima Bilan for Russia in 2006), Serebro did not perform at the event.

In late February, Serebro performed "Zhuravli" on Zvezda, a popular television programme in Russia, featuring artists singing patriotic songs. Originally written as a poem by Rasul Gamzatov "Zhuravli" is one of the most famous Russian songs coming out of World War II. On 13 May 2008 Serebro announced on their official website that they will be releasing their third official single, called "Opium". The song premiered on a Russian morning radio show BrigadaU on Europa Plus radio and until 17 March 2008 Europa Plus held exclusive rights to play the song.  The girls also announced an English version of "Opium" titled "Why", but it was not released until its inclusion on their second studio album in 2012. The song did not enjoy worldwide success, but had success in their native Russia.

In 2008 the group continued their work on their first album, OpiumRoz, which had a projected release date of 17 October. Unfortunately, there was a delay in the release of their debut album as there were some problems in the track list. In November, the girls released the new song, "Skazhi, ne Molchi" ("Say, Don't be silent"). The song did not achieve worldwide success, but managed to score the top spots in their native Russia. A music video was also aired for the single not long after its final release. In November 2008, Serebro was awarded by MTV RMA Awards for the Best Group. After a number of delays with their debut album, OpiumRoz, it was finally released on 25 April 2009, and was presented at the band's concert on Poklonnaya Hill. Serebro was supported by other musicians, including Russian entrant to the Eurovision Song Contest 2004 Yulia Savicheva; OpiumRoz was the result of two years recording. Positive reactions came from both critics and the public alike. A public reviewer for Amazon.com awarded the album an all five stars calling it a "high quality" and that the "performance as well as style of music is good music." The album, however, did not chart anywhere and failed to make an impact on record charts.

2009—2012: Line-up change, experimental works and Mama Lover 

On 18 June 2009 it was announced that Marina Lizorkina had left the band, due to both financial and personal reasons. Many reports around Russia reported that Lizorkina had left due to a recent pregnancy, but bandmate Olga denied these reports. Lizorkina was replaced by Anastasia Karpova. On 24 June 2009 Serebro announced they had finished work on their new music video for their fifth single "Сладко" (English: Sweet) which was released in Russian as well as in English under the title "Like Mary Warner". This single is not featured on the band's debut album and is the first single to feature the work of the latest Serebro member, Anastasia Karpova. Serebro participated in the New Wave Festival in Jūrmala, Latvia, on 29 July 2009 with their song "Skazhi, ne Molchi" and a cover version of "Get the Party Started" by Pink.

On 29 March 2010 Serebro's official website invited women between the ages of 18 and 30 with a "non-standard appearance (piercings, dreadlocks, braids, tattoos, vivid hair color, etc)" to send in applications to feature in their new video and are invited to do so until 3 April 2010 in preparation for the filming of a new music video which began on 4 April 2010. The title of the song was revealed to be "No Time" and was released to radio airplay in Russia on 13 April 2010. The song was written by Maxim Fadeev and the lyrics were written by member Olga Seryabkina. "Не Время" was released on 19 April 2010 and its English counterpart, "Sexing U", was later released on 18 September 2010.

On 26 September 2010, the group held their first solo concert in Prague, Czech Republic. The group then toured the Czech Republic and present gifts to children who reside in social rehabilitation centres. On 4 November 2010, Serebro released their seventh single, "Давай держаться за руки" ("Let's Hold Hands"). The band were also nominated for Best Russian Act at the MTV Europe Music Awards 2010, ultimately losing out to Dima Bilan.

On 30 July 2011, Serebro premiered their eighth single, Mama Lover on Europa Plus Live. It is their third official English language release after Song #1 and Like Mary Warner. On 15 September 2011, the music video for Mama Luba (Russian version of "Mama Lover") was released. After the release of their single Mama Lover, media attention across Europe and other countries was piqued by the single. It became the group's first single to chart in different countries outside the Russian Federation, including Spain, Italy, Belgium and the Czech Republic. According to media outlets, more than 250 parodies of Serebro's music video for the single were uploaded to YouTube alone. The reaction made "Mama Lover" Serebro's most successful single to date and some media sources suggested the group was poised to capture markets beyond Russia. The song was certified Platinum in Italy, selling over 30,000 copies.

On 14 June 2012, Serebro released their second studio album Mama Lover on their label. The album was released in Russia, and was also slated for a European release. The fourth single from the album was Malchik, which was released on 16 June 2012. The single was unsuccessful for the group, peaking at 124 on the Russian Singles Chart and ended Serebro's run of consecutive top ten hits. Still, the album sold well and Mama Lover was later certified double platinum in Russia, selling more than 300,000 copies.

2013–2015: New record label, new music projects and Anastasia/Elena's Departure 
After the decline of their success after "Mama Lover", the group started to record songs for their third studio album. In January 2013, the group announced that they would release their further material in Japan after signing with EMI Music. They also announced that they plan to release a compilation entitled Serebration that includes songs from their first and second studio albums. The group traveled to Japan to promote the compilation album and to do a live concert tour.<ref>About - Serebro.su Comment; In January 2013 the group SEREBRO signed a contract with the Japanese label - EMI JP and in March went to the promo-tour and presented her a platinum record in Japan [for Serebration]. They toured in Tokyo for two nights."</ref>

In March 2013, the group released their promotional single "Sexy Ass", but it failed to chart in Russia. In June 2013, the group released their single "Mi Mi Mi" which charted in Italy, peaking at 5 on the Italian iTunes chart. In July 2013, the group released the song "Malo Tebya". The song was released on Russian radio airplay on 10 July and marked a welcome return to the top ten in Russia for the band, ultimately peaking at number five. A new collaboration with DJ M.E.G., entitled "Угар" (Ugar), has premiered on the band's Facebook page and the Promo DJ website on 18 September. The group announced that they signed a deal with Republic Records and Universal Music Group and discussed plans to re-release their single "Mi Mi Mi" as their first international single.

On 28 September, member Anastasia Karpova confirmed her planned departure from the group. Karpova had told Fadeev months prior that she intended to leave the group. She noted that the decision was mutual with other members of the band and that her primary motivation was to pursue a solo career. A new member, named Dasha Shashina, was announced on 3 October 2013. Shashina had re-recorded Anastasia's recordings in the group's songs "Malo Tebya" and "Ugar", which is expected to release a video with Shashina featuring in it.

Temnikova left the group in May 2014, ahead of her planned December exit, after having become pregnant. Karpova temporarily returned until newest member Polina Favorskaya was introduced on 5 June 2014.

Serebro's 3rd studio album '925' was supposed to be released on iTunes Russia on 15 October 2015 but due to their studio harddrive being stolen, the album release had to be cancelled.

 2016–2020: Sila tryokh, Seryabkina's departure, full reformation and disbandment
On 1 May 2016, Shashina left the group due to serious health issues and having to undergo two surgeries, and was replaced by Katya Kischuk.

On 26 April 2016, it was announced that the album '925' was renamed Sila tryokh (The Power of Three) and was put up on the Russian iTunes for pre-order and a release date for 27 May.

On 2 June 2016, Serebro announced on their Facebook that a new single titled "Slomana" (Broken), which was released on 6 June 2016.

On 25 August Serebro announced a new single called "Serdtse patsanki" (Tomboy's Heart), which is a soundtrack for the movie PATSANKI, and on 5 September 2016, Serebro premiered the full version of the song. Favorskaya announced she'd be leaving the group in August 2017, and an open casting was announced to find her replacement. The three finalists from the open casting were later revealed to be Anastasia Gribkhova, Tatiana Morgunova, and Anastasia Popova. Following several stages of auditions, Morgunova was announced as Favorskaya's replacement in November 2017. They performed live shows as a quartet until the end of 2017.

In October 2018, Seryabkina revealed that she'd be leaving Serebro in the beginning of 2019 in order to prioritize her solo career. Seryabkina was the only remaining original member of the group. The following month an open casting was announced for three new soloists, with Kischuk and Morgunova revealing that they would be leaving the group as well with Seryabkina.

On 30 October 2019 Maxim Fadeev announced that he terminated the contracts with all artists of the MALFA label. He noted that the performers received copyright for all content free of charge. The exception is two artists with whom litigation is ongoing. According to Fadeev, this is the most dramatic change in the entire existence of MALFA.

On 31 October 2019 Maxim Fadeev revealed in an interview that all of the songs under the Serebro name have been given to Olga Seryabkina. Although Olga was also released with all the artists the day prior, Serebro itself is still a global brand he controls, and Maxim will be thinking about how he will approach using the brand while keeping the popularity that it had when Seryabkina was a member.

On 7 June 2020, Maxim Fadeev confirmed the band’s disbandment through an Instagram comment: “ «Серебро» не будет никогда! Для меня это самые болезненные и мерзкие воспоминания! Будет, что то другое! “ / “ “Serebro” will never be! For me, these are the most painful and vile memories! There will be something else!”

Members

 Elena Temnikova (born 18 April 1985 in Kurgan, Russia) came to media prominence as a contestant on the Channel One talent show Star Factory in 2003. She was spotted by Maxim Fadeev, the main producer of Star Factory, and signed to his recording company Monolit Records. Although Temnikova released two disco singles, "Begi" and "Taina", she did not continue her solo career and joined Serebro instead. She married co-member of Star Factory Alexey Semenov; the two separated in 2007, before a settlement for divorce. She then had a brief conflict with Fedeev, after dating and subsequently leaving his brother. She currently resides in Moscow, Russia. On 15 May 2014 the official Serebro website reported that Elena had left the group due to ill health. She was replaced with Karpova who had left the band earlier the previous year until they find a replacement.
 Olga Seryabkina (born 12 April 1985 in Moscow, Russia) began to study ballet at the age of seven. She was awarded the rank of "Master of Sports Candidate". She took part in many international dancing competitions. Seryabkina graduated from the Department for Estrada and Pop Singing at the Art School, and in 2006 graduated from university with a degree in "Translation and Entrepreneurship". She was brought in to audition for Serebro by her friend Temnikova. In addition to performing, Seryabkina also contributed to producing and writing a number of the group's songs. She first contributed as a writer on the group's single "Like Mary Warner", and also wrote and composed some of the songs featured on Mama Lover. She left the group in the beginning of 2019 to focus on her solo career.
 Marina Lizorkina (born 9 June 1983 in Moscow, Russia) entered the Contemporary Art University in Moscow at the age of sixteen. She used to sing in a choir, before she became the lead singer of the group "Formula". In 2004, they released a few singles for the series Obrechennaya Stat Zvezdoy. Lizorkina was the last to join Serebro, after she saw an Internet announcement.
 Anastasia Karpova (born 2 November 1984 in Balakovo, Russia) was very interested in music since her early age, but dedicated herself to ballet. She was also attending singing classes and decided to pursue her singing career. Anastasia had replaced Lizorkina, after the latter announced her departure. She first had her debut with the group on their single "Like Mary Warner". Anastasia, along with Elena and Olga had recorded their second studio album Mama Lover, making it Karpova's first full-length studio album. Karpova decided to leave the group to pursue a solo career. The song "УГАР" was her last song with the group.
 Dasha Shashina (born 1 September 1990 in Nizhny Novgorod, Russia) is the replacement of Anastasia Karpova, who began performing with the group in October 2013. Shashina left the group in March 2016 due to serious health issues and having to undergo two surgeries.
 Polina Favorskaya (born 21 November 1991 in Volgograd, Russia) was the replacement of Elena Temnikova, who was introduced 5 June 2014. Favorskaya announced she was leaving the group in August 2017, but continued performing with them until the end of 2017.
 Katya Kischuk (born 13 December 1993 in Tula, Russia) was introduced in April 2016 to replace Dasha Shashina. She left the group in the beginning of 2019.
Tatiana Morgunova (born 25 January 1998 in Aktobe, Kazakhstan) was introduced in November 2017 to replace Polina Favorskaya. She was cast following an open casting process. She left the group in the beginning of 2019.
Irina Titova (born 22 January 1997 in Tashkent, Uzbekistan) was introduced in 2019 following the complete reformation of the group. She was born in Tashkent, lived in Belgium, and then moved to Russia.
Elizaveta Kornilova (born 22 June 2000) was introduced in 2019 following the complete reformation of the group.
Marianna Kochurova (born 6 July 1996 in Saint Petersburg, Russia) was introduced in 2019 following the complete reformation of the group.

Artistry
Musical style
Serebro's sound is primarily described as Europop. One review for their EP Izbrannoe suggested that the group was a successor to t.A.T.u and VIA Gra, other all-female Russian groups that experienced significant success both in Russia and internationally. On their first studio album, OpiumRoz, the group featured a more alternative rock style of music that incorporated other genres including dance-pop, grunge, punk rock and pop rock.

 Awards 

|-
! colspan="3" style="background: cyan;" | World Music Awards
|-

|-

Discography

 2009: ОпиумRoz 2012: Mama Lover 2016: Сила трёх''

Tour dates
 Tour (2007–09)
 Tour (2010–12)
 Tour (2013)

References

External links
 
 
 Serebro at Forbes 
 

 
Eurovision Song Contest entrants for Russia
Eurovision Song Contest entrants of 2007
Russian girl groups
Russian dance musicians
World Music Awards winners
Musical groups from Moscow
English-language singers from Russia
Russian National Music Award winners
Winners of the Golden Gramophone Award